Matilde Ravizza (born 27 December 1971) is a former Italian female mountain runner and long-distance runner who won a medal at individual senior level  at the World Mountain Running Championships.

Ravizza won Florence Marathon in 1997.

Biography
She also participated at the 1999 IAAF World Cross Country Championships – Senior women's race and was 4th in the marathon race at the 1997 Mediterranean Games

See also
 Italy at the World Mountain Running Championships

References

External links
 

1971 births
Living people
Italian female mountain runners
Italian female marathon runners
Italian female cross country runners
Athletes (track and field) at the 1997 Mediterranean Games
Mediterranean Games competitors for Italy
20th-century Italian women
21st-century Italian women